In statistics, a multivariate Pareto distribution is a multivariate extension of a univariate Pareto distribution.

There are several different types of univariate Pareto distributions including Pareto Types I−IV and Feller−Pareto. Multivariate Pareto distributions have been defined for many of these types.

Bivariate Pareto distributions

Bivariate Pareto distribution of the first kind

Mardia (1962) defined a bivariate distribution with cumulative distribution function (CDF) given by

and joint density function

 
The marginal distributions are Pareto Type 1 with density functions

 

The means and variances of the marginal distributions are

and for a > 2, X1 and X2 are positively correlated with

Bivariate Pareto distribution of the second kind

Arnold   suggests representing the bivariate Pareto Type I complementary CDF by

If the location and scale parameter are allowed to differ, the complementary CDF is

which has Pareto Type II univariate marginal distributions. This distribution is called a multivariate Pareto distribution of type II by Arnold. (This definition is not equivalent to Mardia's bivariate Pareto distribution of the second kind.)

For a > 1, the marginal means are

while for a > 2, the variances, covariance, and correlation are the same as for multivariate Pareto of the first kind.

Multivariate Pareto distributions

Multivariate Pareto distribution of the first kind

Mardia's Multivariate Pareto distribution of the First Kind has the joint probability density function given by

The marginal distributions have the same form as (1), and the one-dimensional marginal distributions have a Pareto Type I distribution. The complementary CDF is

The marginal means and variances are given by

If a > 2 the covariances and correlations are positive with

Multivariate Pareto distribution of the second kind

Arnold suggests representing the multivariate Pareto Type I complementary CDF by

If the location and scale parameter are allowed to differ, the complementary CDF is

which has marginal distributions of the same type (3) and Pareto Type II univariate marginal distributions. This distribution is called a multivariate Pareto distribution of type II by Arnold.

For a > 1, the marginal means are

while for a > 2, the variances, covariances, and correlations are the same as for multivariate Pareto of the first kind.

Multivariate Pareto distribution of the fourth kind
A random vector X has a k-dimensional multivariate Pareto distribution of the Fourth Kind if its joint survival function is

The k1-dimensional marginal distributions (k1<k) are of the same type as (4), and the one-dimensional marginal distributions are Pareto Type IV.

Multivariate Feller–Pareto distribution
A random vector X has a k''-dimensional Feller–Pareto distribution if

where

are independent gamma variables. The marginal distributions and conditional distributions are of the same type (5); that is, they are multivariate Feller–Pareto distributions. The one–dimensional marginal distributions are of Feller−Pareto  type.

References

Multivariate continuous distributions